Robbie Jay Montgomery (born 22 September 1994) is an English cricketer who played for Gloucestershire County Cricket Club. Primarily a right arm fast-medium bowler, he also bats right-handed.  He was released by Gloucestershire at the end of the 2015 season, without having played any first-class cricket that summer due to ongoing lower back troubles.

References

External links
 

1994 births
Living people
English cricketers
Sportspeople from Taunton
Gloucestershire cricketers